Lucius Cornelius Balbus may refer to:
 Lucius Cornelius Balbus (consul), Roman consul and friend of Julius Caesar
 Lucius Cornelius Balbus the Younger, nephew of L. Cornelius Balbus Maior